Syringoderma is a genus in the family Syringodermataceae of the brown algae (class Phaeophyceae).  The genus contains four species.

References

Further reading

Brown algae
Brown algae genera